Paramanandayya Sishyula Katha is a 1966 Indian Telugu-language swashbuckler film directed by C. Pullayya. It stars N. T. Rama Rao, K. R. Vijaya with music composed by Ghantasala. It is produced by Thota Subba Rao under the Sridevi Productions banner.
 
The film was earlier made in Telugu in 1950 as Paramanandayya Sishyulu starring N. T. Rama Rao and K. R. Vijaya in pivotal roles. The movie was remade in Kannada in 1981 as Guru Shishyaru.

Plot
The film is based on the story of the disciples of Paramanandayya, seven saints in number. They are the disciples of Aruna Keerti Mahamuni. Chitralekha dances in the court of Lord Siva. He gives her a Rudraksha mala to wear during the visits. Later, she visits the beautiful Earth with her companions and enjoys bathing in a pool. She finds these Sishiyas keenly looking at her and curses them to becoming fools. After knowing the facts from Guruji and realizing her mistake, she pronounces the Vimukti free from the curse at the time of her marriage. The Guru, Aruna Keerti, in return curses Chitralekha that she will lose her celestial status if she comes into contact with a human.

He advises the Sishyas to go to Rajaguru the Principle Court Spiritual Adviser Paramanandayya at Vijayadurgam, ruled by Nandivardhana Maharaja. Paramanandayya accepts them as his disciples. Chitralekha forgets the Rudraksha mala while returning to Heaven. The mala is accidentally found by the Maharaja when he comes to hunt in the forest. Chitralekha remembers her mala, and goes to the palace as a snake and tries to steal the mala.  However, Maharajah dreams about the Devakanya a celestial maiden touches Chitralekha, who loses her divine powers and memory. Maharajah calls Paramanandayya for advice. He tells the Raja to hand over the mala to her, making her regain the sequence of events. He advises her to pray to Lord Siva to attain divinity so she can go back to Heaven.

Meanwhile, whatever the Sishiyas do out of ignorance turns out to be a good thing for the Paramanandayya family. They save them from thieves etc. Finally, they decided to die as Guruji strongly scolded them for purchasing a dead cow. They eat Vishapu Undalu and go to the streets. Night patrolling, Rajabhat takes them to the Royal Court. They thought of Maharaja as Indra and Ranjani as an Apsara. They reach the house of Ranjani and make the Maharaja know the criminal plans of the Minister. The Sishyas spoiled the marriage of daughter Girija with the tuberculosis patient and saved Paramanandayya from another family crisis. Ousted by Guruji, they reach RajaMahal and spoil an attempt to kill Maharaja by Jaggarayudu and Minister. They convinced Chitralekha to marry the Maharaja. During the marriage ceremony, they are released from the curse and regain their sainthood.

Cast
N. T. Rama Rao as Nandivardhana Maharaju
K. R. Vijaya as Chitralekha
L. Vijayalakshmi as Ranjani
V. Nagayya as Paramanandayya
Sobhan Babu as Lord Siva
Satyanarayana as Jaggarayudu
Padmanabham as Nandi (Sishya)
Allu Ramalingaiah as Bhringi (Sishya)
Raja Babu as Phani (Sishya)
Mukkamala as Minister
Chaya Devi as Anandam
Dr. Sivaramakrishnayya as Virupakshayya
Vangara as Parabrahma Sastry
Sarathi as (Sishya)
Modukuri Satyam as (Sishya) 
Ramachandra Rao as (Sishya)

Soundtrack

Music composed by Ghantasala.

References

External links 
 

1960s adventure comedy films
1966 comedy films
1966 films
Films scored by Ghantasala (musician)
Indian black-and-white films
Telugu films remade in other languages
1960s Telugu-language films
Films directed by C. Pullayya